Wigston Parva is a hamlet and civil parish in the Blaby district of Leicestershire, England.  The parish has a population of about 30.  It is very near the county boundary with Warwickshire.  Nearby places include Smockington, and Sharnford. The population of the hamlet at the 2011 census was included in the civil parish of Stanton and Flamville.

External links

Hamlets in Leicestershire
Civil parishes in Leicestershire
Blaby